Fouad Salam Alam (born 9 October 1951) is an Egyptian volleyball player. He competed in the men's tournament at the 1976 Summer Olympics.

References

External links

1951 births
Living people
Egyptian men's volleyball players
Olympic volleyball players of Egypt
Volleyball players at the 1976 Summer Olympics
Place of birth missing (living people)